Micropond may be
a millionth of a pond, a unit of force
a small pond in hydrology etc.
MicroPond, a brand of Aquascape
a digital organism simulator, Artificial life#Program-based